Holzappel is a municipality in the Rhein-Lahn-Kreis, Rhineland-Palatinate, Germany, with a population in 2006 of 1100. It belongs to the association community of Diez.

Holzappel was a county and state of the Holy Roman Empire from 1643 until 1714. It was founded by Peter Melander, an imperial field marshal during the Thirty Years' War. In 1714, it was inherited by Anhalt-Bernburg.

See also
County of Holzappel

References

Rhein-Lahn-Kreis